Reuben Kadish (January 29, 1913 – September 20, 1992) was an American artist, specializing as a sculptor, draughtsman, muralist, painter, and printmaker. In his later career he also taught art history and sculpture in New York City.

Biography

Early life
Born in Chicago to immigrant parents from Kovno (now Kaunas) in Czarist Russia (now Lithuania), he was the oldest of three sons. The family moved to Los Angeles, California in 1920 and it was there that Kadish developed strong roots and lifelong friendships.

His father, Samuel Kadish was a painting contractor by trade but also harbored strong political interests having been, while a young man in pre-revolutionary Russia, a member of the Marxist-oriented General Jewish Labour Bund in Kovno. The Yiddish-speaking household was rich in books and magazines though the artist's father had stopped his formal schooling at age ten. The elder Kadish was quite artistic in his own right as a trained decorative painter, expert in various decorative painting techniques such as Faux Bois and marbling. He passed his artistic proclivities to his eldest son, Reuben, who from an early age drew everything in sight.  Kadish also inherited his father's political activism and, as a teenager, became a political radical, leading a protest against the U.S. Marine presence in Nicaragua, which resulted in his suspension from high school.

Early art career

By 1930, Kadish was a student at the Otis Art Institute in Los Angeles, where he befriended two young men who not only became his lifelong friends but who would later wield an enormous influence on the postwar art world: Philip Goldstein (later known as Philip Guston) and Jackson Pollock. Guston and Pollock had been classmates at the Manual Arts High School in Los Angeles until both were expelled for distributing satirical pamphlets. Although Pollock never studied at Otis (he moved to New York City in 1930 to study at the Art Students League of New York with Thomas Hart Benton), he often visited Los Angeles, remained close with Guston and struck up an instant rapport with Kadish.

Guston and Kadish soon grew tired of Otis and set up a studio nearby where they continued their self-taught apprenticeship to Renaissance painting and the growing movement of the Mexican muralists.

Mural period

The young men would soon make a big impression on the famed Mexican muralist and left-wing firebrand, David Alfaro Siqueiros. Kadish had volunteered his services to the charismatic Siqueiros and chauffeured the famed artist around Los Angeles and assisted him in local outdoor mural projects such as the Plaza Art Center in 1932. "I was his 'go-boy' for this, 'go-boy' for that," recalled Kadish during an interview with the Archives of American Art in 1991. "I never expected any remuneration and enjoyed the intensity and vigor of the guy. He had tremendous charisma. Along with Thomas Hart Benton, the main thing I got out of these people was that they were interested in big ideas."

Siqueiros had secured a major mural commission in Morelia, Michoacán, and had intended to execute the project himself but his energies were drawn to Europe by the Spanish Republican movement and the nascent Spanish Civil War. Several other more prominent artists were in the running for the opportunity but for various reasons, declined. After seeing photos the duo had sent him of a completed mural project for a community center in LA, Siqueiros invited his young charges to paint a  mural at the University of Michoacán in Morelia, the former summer palace of Emperor Maximilian. Their mutual friend, the poet and budding art critic Jules Langsner accompanied the young men to Mexico, their first venture outside the U.S. At ages 21 (Kadish) and 22 (Goldstein), they literally became art stars once the U.S. press got wind of their radically themed mural. The ambitious, wall-sized composition, titled The Struggle Against War and Fascism, encompassed both Renaissance and Surrealist influences, complete with dangerous looking hooded figures strongly reminiscent of Ku Klux Klan thugs and their forebears from the Spanish Inquisition.

Kadish and Guston returned to the U.S. and joined the fledgling artistic arm of the Works Progress Administration. In 1935 they painted a politically charged mural (recently restored) at City of Hope, at the time a tuberculosis hospital located in Duarte, California. But that proved to be the end of their short-lived but remarkable partnership. The two split up after that, with Guston moving to New York City and Kadish to San Francisco.

Great Depression and World War II

As a WPA artist during the Great Depression, Kadish executed the brilliant and still extant A Dissertation on Alchemy mural in the Chemistry Building at San Francisco State University in 1937. It proved to be his solo San Francisco commission despite submitting twenty odd designs for the WPA. "[My designs] were too flamboyant, too revolutionary, too this, too that," recalled Kadish in the Archives of American Art interview.

During World War II, Kadish worked as a civilian for Bethlehem Steel and the shipping industry, building destroyers and submarines until he was recruited to join the U.S. Army's Artist Unit, an elite branch funded by Congress to artistically document the war effort. Many of his searing images of bombed-out villages in Burma and India and heart-rending scenes of death and starvation are now in the collection of the U.S. Army Center of Military History in Washington, D.C.

Dairy farming

But the earth-shaking events of World War II had another impact on Kadish, back in the U.S. with a young family to support and no job prospects, so to speak. He worked for twenty-five cents per impression in a part-time job for Stanley Hayter's storied Atelier 17 in Greenwich Village, printing editions for the likes of Joan Miró, André Masson and other European Surrealists.

Keen on living in New York City (a dream he had ever since his first boyhood visit in the mid-1920s when he saw a Courbet nude at The Metropolitan Museum of Art), Kadish wanted to join old friends like Jackson Pollock who were migrating to the eastern end of Long Island for cheap housing. But Kadish had no luck there and eventually found a run down,  farm in northern New Jersey, about sixty miles from Manhattan. He more or less turned his back on the percolating New York City art world where Abstract Expressionism and the New York School were raging and became a successful dairy farmer. Years later, the artist characterized that move: "Unfortunately I lost and separated myself from that world. It could have been in Kansas. Really, it was one of the biggest mistakes of my life."

Though he quickly became an expert dairy farmer and grew enamored of the land and life cycles of raising animals, misfortune pursued him. A catastrophic fire in his metal quonset hut studio on the farm in the late 1940s destroyed all but a few of his Abstract Expressionist paintings.  He would never paint again. But after hard times of torment about his loss, the artist, geared to the soil and hands-on machinery of the farm, became a sculptor.

Cooper Union period
Once that dramatic transformation was made, Kadish moved his family back to New York City, renting out his land to tenant farmers and starting a new career. He taught design at the Newark School of Fine and Industrial Arts, the Brooklyn Museum of Art School and finally in 1960, began his long association with the Cooper Union in Manhattan as a professor of art history and sculpture.

Setting himself up in a small carriage house on East 9th Street, a walking distance from Cooper, the new empire included a nasty basement where his etching press was set up. So Kadish, after a ten-year exile, returned to the then booming New York School scene that still championed Abstract Expressionist painting and largely ignored sculpture, except for the legendary likes of David Smith.

Apart from his teaching and art-making in the late 1950s and 1960s, Kadish also moonlighted as part-owner of the White Horse Tavern, the legendary Greenwich Village bar where the British poet Dylan Thomas died from alcohol poisoning in 1953.

During the 1960s, Kadish's wife, Barbara Weeks Kadish, actively pursued her lifelong passion for archaeology at New York University, eventually heading NYU's pre-history dig at Aphrodisias in southwestern Turkey. Julian, the youngest of their three sons, accompanied Barbara to Turkey for several of her summer expeditionary digs. In 1962, Dan Kadish, the couple's oldest son, married Philip Guston's daughter, Musa Jane Guston.

In 1977, Kadish led a group of students in completing the restoration of the historic Foundation Building at Cooper Union, casting missing and broken pieces of the cast-iron lamps and capitals in the shop's foundry, saving the school approximately $40,000.

Kadish created an impressive oeuvre of deeply scored terra cotta and bronze sculpture that was viscerally reflective of his Abstract Expressionist roots and hammered out a respectable exhibition career. It included stints with the Elaine Poindexter Gallery and Grace Borgenicht Gallery as well as two retrospective exhibitions at the Artists' Choice Museum in SoHo (1985) and the New Jersey State Museum (1990).

Reception

But for a variety of complex reasons, some of it a result of his decidedly prickly and often combative manner, Kadish made a far larger impact on a generation of art students who passed through the great hall of Cooper Union than his career in the New York City art world.

Those lucky ones heard Kadish's thundering lectures on Egyptian funerary sculpture, Greek mythology, and cinema-like slide shows of exotic art and architecture from around the world. A portion of that huge slide collection is now part of Cooper's Library.

Even during his most prolific period during the mid-1980s when he executed his brutally expressionistic caste of terra cotta and bronze portrait heads, most attention from critics, art historians, and filmmakers were centered not on Kadish's artworks but his raconteur-like recollections of the deified Jackson Pollock or his personal brushes with Siqueiros and other artistic titans like Joan Miró.

In fact, Kadish and his late wife Barbara turn up as characters in Pollock, the Hollywood film starring Ed Harris.

Legacy
Since his death in 1992 at the age of 79, the Reuben Kadish Art Foundation has worked with one goal in mind. It's simple and straightforward: distributing Kadish's sculpture and graphic work to museums and public collections in order to make his name and contribution to the annals of American Art better known to new generations.

As Kadish himself said: "It is my wish and direction that my works of art shall be conserved, displayed and distributed to reach the widest practicable public and shall not be sold or otherwise exploited for the private gain of any individual."

References

External links
Reuben Kadish papers online at the Smithsonian Archives of American Art

1913 births
1992 deaths
Atelier 17 alumni
American people of Lithuanian-Jewish descent
Jewish American artists
Federal Art Project artists
Bethlehem Steel people
20th-century American Jews